Sonoma Depot was a railway station in Sonoma, California.

History
Built by the Sonoma Valley Railroad some time between 1875 and 1880, the station served the narrow-gauge railway from a location on the northwest corner of Sonoma Plaza. Local pressure eventually led to relocation of the rail line and depot off of Spain Street. Passenger service ended in 1942.

The depot was added to the National Register of Historic Places on April 3, 1975, only having been retired from serving as crew quarters a few years prior. The original building was destroyed in a fire in 1976 and was completely rebuilt in 1979. Despite this, it remains on the register. Sonoma Depot is the centerpiece of Sonoma Depot Park, and has been reopened as a museum. It is a Sonoma historic landmark.

References

External links
Sonoma Depot Park Museum

Railway stations in Sonoma County, California
Railway stations on the National Register of Historic Places in California
Railway stations closed in 1942
Museums in Sonoma, California
Former Northwestern Pacific Railroad stations
National Register of Historic Places in Sonoma County, California